Viswanathan Ramamoorthy is a 2001 Indian Tamil language film written and directed by Rama Narayanan. The film stars Ramki, Vivek, Roja, Vindhya, and Kovai Sarala. It was released on 10 August 2001. The film is inspired by the 1970 Tamil film Veettuku Veedu which was based on Chitralaya Gopu's play Thikku Theriyatha Veettil which in turn was an adaptation of the English comedy play Right Bed Wrong Husband. The film's title pays homage to the composer duo Viswanathan–Ramamoorthy.

Plot 
Viswanathan is the timid husband of Meena, a small-time artist. Viswanathan’s friend Ramamoorthy, along with his wife Shenbagam, go from their village to Chennai with the hopes of becoming a movie director. Ramamoorthy and Shenbagam stay in Viswanathan’s home. While Meena is away for a few days for shooting, Viswanathan discovers that his uncle has died with a will of Rs. 30 lakhs written in favour of Viswanathan. However, there is a check in the will that the money should be granted to Viswanathan only if Meena behaves well with Viswanathan. There comes Kathavarayan, Viswanathan’s uncle’s manager (who is in charge of the money) and his daughter Andal. As Meena is away for shooting, Ramamoorthy comes up with a plan. Ramamoorthy requests Shenbagam to act as Meena in front of Kathavarayan, so that he develops confidence and hands over the money. Meanwhile, Andal gets attracted towards Ramamoorthy, believing him to be the man who comes in her dreams often. Meena is cheated by her manager and is in financial distress. She gets back to her home and is shocked to see Shenbagam acting as her. However, Meena agrees for the plan as she is also in need of money. After many funny incidents, Kathavarayan gives the money to Viswanathan as Meena has transformed into a caring wife now. Viswanathan also decides to produce a movie to be directed by Ramamoorthy as a token of thanks.

Cast 

Ramki as Viswanathan
Vivek as Ramamoorthy
Roja as Meena
Vindhya as Shenbagam
Kovai Sarala as Andal
Vennira Aadai Moorthy as Kathavarayan, Andal's father
R. Sundarrajan as Ramamoorthy's father
MRK as Viswanathan's uncle
Kumarimuthu as Film Producer
Idichapuli Selvaraj as Restaurant Owner
Mayilsamy as Sivakumar
Kalidoss as Loan Shark
Telephone Mani as Police Constable
Kottai Perumal
Master Mahendran as Mahendran
Vijayakanth as Himself (cameo appearance)

Soundtrack 
The music was composed by S. A. Rajkumar, with lyrics written by Pa. Vijay, Snehan and Rama. Narayanan.

Reception 
Tamil Star Online said, "The film is not a disappointment, because there was not much of an expectation from the beginning. Those who have seen the director's earlier films know exactly what to expect. So, while the urban audience may squirm in their seats, the targetted audience – the B and C centres as they call them in filmy parlance – will most probably lap it all up". Malathi Ragarajan of The Hindu said, "Unfortunately, Rama. Narayanan is unable to use the setup creatively".

References

External links 
 

2000s Tamil-language films
2001 films
Films directed by Rama Narayanan
Films scored by S. A. Rajkumar